Ernest Carter may refer to:

Ernest Carter (drummer), American drummer
Ernest Carter (footballer) (1889–1955), Australian rules footballer 
Ernest Trow Carter (1866–1953), organist and composer
Spoon Carter (Ernest C. Carter Jr., 1902–1974), American baseball player